Happelia (minor planet designation: 578 Happelia) is a minor planet orbiting the Sun. On 24 February 2017 a possible small 3-kilometer moon was found orbiting the asteroid, based on occultation observations.

References

External links
 Lightcurve plot of 578 Happelia, Palmer Divide Observatory, B. D. Warner (2008)
 Lightcurves 578 Happelia, tripod.com
 Asteroid Lightcurve Database (LCDB), query form (info )
 Dictionary of Minor Planet Names, Google books
 Asteroids and comets rotation curves, CdR – Observatoire de Genève, Raoul Behrend
 Discovery Circumstances: Numbered Minor Planets (1)-(5000) – Minor Planet Center
 
 

Background asteroids
Happelia
Happelia
Xc-type asteroids (SMASS)
19051101